Walston-Bulluck House, also known as the Pender Museum, is a historic home located at Tarboro, Edgecombe County, North Carolina. It was built about 1795, and is a one-story, three bay, frame dwelling.  It has a Hall and parlor plan and two reconstructed double-shouldered brick end chimneys.  The house is sheathed in weatherboard, has a gable roof, and rests on a brick pier foundation.  It was moved from its original location near Conetoe to its present site in 1969, and restored by the Edgecomb County Historical Society.

It was listed on the National Register of Historic Places in 1971. It is located in the Tarboro Historic District.

References

External links
Pender Museum of Edgecombe County History

Historic house museums in North Carolina
Houses on the National Register of Historic Places in North Carolina
Houses completed in 1795
Houses in Edgecombe County, North Carolina
National Register of Historic Places in Edgecombe County, North Carolina
Museums in Edgecombe County, North Carolina
Individually listed contributing properties to historic districts on the National Register in North Carolina